James Taylor (born 1976) is an English male former track and road cyclist.

Cycling career
Taylor is a ten times national champion of which nine were on the track. The nine track titles at the British National Track Championships were the British National Omnium Championships in 2000, 2002 & 2003, the British National Madison Championships in 2000, 2001, 2002, 2004, 2005 & 2006, the British National Scratch Championships in 2001.

References

1976 births
British male cyclists
British track cyclists
Living people